The repopulation of wolves in Colorado began with the natural expansion of the gray wolf into habitats in Colorado they occupied prior to the wolf's near extirpated from the conterminous United States. In the 1940s, the species was nearly eradicated from the Southern Rockies. Wolves were reintroduced in the northern Rocky Mountains in the 1990s and since at least 2014, solitary wolves have entered Colorado. A resident group in northwestern Colorado was confirmed in early 2020. In June 2021, Colorado Parks and Wildlife (CPW) reported that the first litter of wolf pups had been born in the state since the 1940s. With a November 2020 ballot measure, voters approved the measure which ordered state wildlife managers to reintroduce wolves by the end of 2023 somewhere on Colorado's Western Slope and offer fair compensation for any livestock killed by the predators.

Federal protection 

Wolves once thrived here due to the availability of a number of big game species such as American bison, elk, and deer. Other prey for the wolves included a number of small game species like rabbits and rodents. Extirpation was caused by the decimation of the wolf's main prey species like bison, the expansion of agriculture, and extermination campaigns. As wolves turned to the nontraditional food source of fenced in and relatively defenseless cattle, Colorado established a bounty for killing wolves in 1869. After the trapping and poisoning of wolves in Colorado in the 1930s, the last wild wolf in the state was shot in 1940s in Conejos County. 

Wolves in the United States were protected under the federal Endangered Species Act in 1978 as they were in danger of going extinct and needed protection to aid their recovery. The U.S. Fish and Wildlife Service removed gray wolves’ endangered species status at the beginning of January 2021 when more than 6,000 wolves were living in nine states. After federal wolf protection ended, the states and tribes again became responsible to manage the animal and regulate hunting. In Colorado wolves continue to be classified as a protected endangered species. Fines, jail time and a loss of hunting license privileges can result from violations. In February 2022, a judge ordered federal protections for gray wolves to be restored under the Federal Endangered Species Act which returned management authority to the U.S. Fish and Wildlife Service.

Natural recolonization 
Wolves have been dispersing from the northern Rocky Mountains since they were introduced there in the 1990s. A Wolf Working Group was formed in 2004 to create a management plan that provides policy for wildlife managers as they handle potential conflicts between the wolves, humans, and livestock. Their report recommended that any wolves that migrate to Colorado “should be allowed to live with no boundaries where they find habitat". They also decided against pursuing wolf reintroduction. They recommended using various types of technology for monitoring their movements (GPS animal tracking and Camera traps)  along with a management plan that would provide flexibility for ranchers concerned about attacks on livestock and deal with concerns that wolves might impact the population of other species like elk.

Six gray wolves were photographed or killed in Colorado between 2004 and 2019. These animals are most likely from the natural dispersion of those reintroduced to Yellowstone National Park. Wildlife officials made a number of additional sightings in 2019. By 2021, some 3,000 wolves were living in portions of Montana, Wyoming, Idaho, Oregon, Washington and Northern California. A pack of six wolves was confirmed in Moffat County in northwestern Colorado in early 2020. Hunters likely killed three members of the pack within a few months just across the border in Wyoming where hunting wolves was legal. F1084 (originally mislabeled as M1084) from the Snake River Pack in Wyoming wandered more than  into Colorado before her tracking collar went dead. She formed a breeding pair with M2101, a four-year-old male weighing approximately  who was collared in February 2021. Governor Jared Polis dubbed the animals “Jane” and “John”, respectively and welcomed the pair to Colorado. Collaring the wolf was the first opportunity for Colorado Parks and Wildlife (CPW) to start the process of managing and tracking what’s happening in Colorado since they gained authority over the species after the animals were removed from the endangered species list. Officials confirmed that they had six pups was living in the state in June 2021, the first known litter in the state since the 1940s. One of the pups, a female, was fitted with a tracking collar in February 2022. The wolf was designated as F2202 using the first 2 digits to indicate the year and the sequentially assigned next 2 digits that have an odd number for males and an even number for females. Physical evidence such as tracks and scat are also used by wildlife officers to track and observe wolves’ movements and behaviors. 

The economy of rural northwestern Colorado includes vineyards, wineries, fruit orchards, and sheep and cattle ranches. Ranchers in North Park expressed concern in September 2021 when they started seeing the six wolf pups and their parents. The returning wolf population potentially threatens their herds and livelihood. Ranchers and other residents are limited in the actions they can take to fend off the wolves under Colorado law and federal protections that were reinstated in February 2022. Unless a person’s life is directly in danger, they can not do anything that might injure or kill the animals. CPW began working with ranchers in North Park in January 2022 after a wolf pack, that likely migrated in from Wyoming, killed livestock and a dog. The North Park basin in Colorado’s north-central mountains saw the first payment made through the Game Damage Program which can also include prevention materials. Various methods have been developed to haze wolves to keep them away and teach them to avoid livestock. About  of fladry was set up around part of a pasture by neighbors and U.S. Department of Agriculture Wildlife Services employees,  consisting of a thin electric wire fence with flags. Night patrols have supplemented the prevention methods and provided observational data. Volunteer patrollers have come from an organization that supports coexistence of ranching families and wolves. Ranchers in other states have found burros will defend cattle that they have been living with. CPW staff provided wild burros in late February from the Nevada high country that were available for adoption to a rancher who experienced depredation and has been piloting these various methods. This rancher has also acquired several Longhorns on the 11,000-acre ranch he leases from the state. In June 2022, the last collar on a wolf in the North Park pack went dead and indications of the location or status of the wolf pack became limited. The 6 year-old female had not been spotted since mid-February in video and photos of the pack consisting of the six yearlings and the breeding male. Wildlife officials have also confirmed there has been no denning activity and no new pups have been seen as would have been expected. In late January-early February 2023, CPW used confirmed reports of wolf sightings from the public and a fixed-wing plane to look for wolves in order to collar two members of the North Park pack. On February 2 2023, the collar on M2101 was replaced when he was captured along with another male, M2301, who is presumably one of six pups produced by F1084 and M2101 in 2021. M2101 slipped out of this collar a few days later, with a Colorado Parks & Wildlife (CPW) employee finding the collar on February 6 after it emitted a mortality signal. M2101 was spotted the next morning without a collar by the CPW. On February 18, M2101 was recaptured and refitted with the collar.

Western slope reintroduction

Reintroducing wolves has been suggested by some at least since the wolves were protected under the federal Endangered Species Act in 1978. While Colorado was not included in the 1987 Northern Rocky Mountain Recovery Plan, citizens of Colorado showed strong support for reintroducing wolves to their state and a generally positive attitude towards wolves when Congress explored the possibility in 1992. In early 2020, a petition for the state to reintroduce wolves to public land in the Colorado Western Slope was certified. Less than a month after this ballot measure was scheduled for the November ballot, the establishment of a group of wolves in northwestern Colorado was confirmed by Parks and Wildlife (CPW). In November 2020, the ballot measure was narrowly approved by voters. The measure directed the Colorado Parks and Wildlife Commission to develop a reintroduction plan using the best scientific data available for gray wolf reintroduction in western Colorado, west of the Continental Divide by the end of 2023. The measure also required fair compensation to be offered to ranchers for any livestock killed by wolves. CPW, which is overseen by the commission, began public outreach to gather input as the details of the plan such as a management strategies were needed to be worked out by the state agency.

One of the arguments in favor of wolf reintroduction was that they help maintain healthy ecosystems. As an apex predator and keystone species, they help maintain healthy and sustainable populations of other species by preventing overpopulation and overgrazing. Passage of the referendum was opposed by many cattle ranchers, elk hunters, farmers and others in rural areas that argue wolf reintroduction is bad policy which will threaten the raising of livestock and a $1 billion hunting industry. The rural Western Slope, where the wolves will be reintroduced, voted heavily against the measure, while the more populous Front Range mostly supported the measure.

In June 2021, CPW reported that the first litter of wolf pups had been born in the state since the 1940s. They were born to a pair of wolves that had naturally entered and settled in the state. The number of these wolves is considered insufficient to establish a sustainable population.

Preparation and public engagement
The Colorado Wolf Restoration and Management Plan Summer 2021 Public Engagement Report was released in November 2021 by Keystone Policy Center. The center facilitated public engagement and tribal consultations, and assisted CPW with the facilitation of the Stakeholder Advisory Group and Technical Working Group. The twenty-member Stakeholder Advisory Group represents different communities with livestock owners, outfitters, and environmentalists. The Technical Working Group, composed of elected officials from the Western Slope, CPW personnel and wolf experts involved in previous restoration efforts, focused on outlining the plan’s conservation objectives and released an initial report in November with recommendations. The Technical Working Group  presented its recommendations to the commission at a June 2022 meeting. In July, fourteen wildlife advocacy groups, including the Center for Biological Diversity, WildEarth Guardians, the Colorado Sierra Club and the Humane Society of the U.S. issued a 26 page plan with alternative protocol for the reintroduction. Their plan included a wolf population goal, reintroduction areas, compensation for lost livestock and other management guidelines that the state had yet to fully address.

A close partnership with the U.S. Fish and Wildlife Service became necessary when a federal judge restored endangered species protections in February 2022. To give the state authority to reintroduce wolves, the agencies are working to set up a 10(j) ruling under the Endangered Species Act, which by designating those wolves as an experimental population gives the agencies more flexibility when trying to reestablish them in Colorado. Wolves would likely come from Idaho, Montana and Wyoming where hunting them is legal. State wildlife agencies manage wolf populations in these states as a congressional budget rider was used to delist wolves which did not change under the federal court action.

Three likely reintroduction release sites with the highest release potential have been identified in previous studies; (1) White River and Routt national forests and Flat Tops Wilderness Area, roughly located north of Glenwood Springs and southwest of Steamboat Springs; (2) Grand Mesa and Gunnison national forests, roughly located south of Glenwood Springs, southwest of Aspen and east of Grand Junction; (3) San Juan Mountains and Weminuche Wilderness, tucked between Silverton and Pagosa Springs. Rocky Mountain National Park was not included in the potential reintroduction sites although the west side of the park was the most-mentioned public suggestion due to the abundance of elk, the main prey species available in Colorado. The initial draft plan was released on Decembers 9, 2022. Wolves tend to move after reintroduction so they will be released at least  from the border with Wyoming, Utah, and New Mexico, as well as Southern Ute tribal lands in southwest Colorado minimizing the risk of the animal immediately migrating into other jurisdictions. A study in 2022 showed that, based on the vote on the reintroduction ballot initiative and other factors, southwest Colorado would be a more welcoming area than other places with suitable wolf habitat. The high-altitude mountains between Aspen and Durango are a zone with enough prey and higher levels of social acceptance. The likely release sites will be on state and private land where there are willing owners rather than widely available U.S. Forest Service land. Compliance with the National Environmental Policy Act would be required to release wolves on federal land which the state is unable to complete before the voter mandated deadline. About 10 to 15 wolves will be released each year. The Wyoming Department of Agriculture (WDA) has concerns that wolves coming into the state pose a substantial and critical threat to livestock in Wyoming.

See also
 History of wolves in Yellowstone
 List of gray wolf populations by country
 Repopulation of wolves in California
 Repopulation of wolves in Midwestern United States

References

External links
 Colorado's Wolf Restoration and Management Plan Public Engagement Website, Keystone Policy Center
 Wolves, Colorado Parks and Wildlife
 Colorado Gray Wolf Updates, U.S. Fish & Wildlife Service
 Gray Wolves in the Northern Rocky Mountains, USDA APHIS Wildlife Services
 Gray wolf (Canis lupus), ECOS - U.S. Fish and Wildlife Service

Wolves in Colorado, Colorado Encyclopedia, History Colorado

Colorado
Wolves
Wolves